Hamdi Al Masri (born 7 April 1983) is a Syrian footballer who plays as a defender and defensive midfielder for Nawair SC which competes in the Syrian Premier League and is a member of the Syria national football team.

International

International goals
Scores and results list Syria's goal tally first.

References

External links
 

1983 births
Living people
Syrian footballers
Association football defenders
Syria international footballers
Syrian expatriate footballers
Expatriate footballers in Iraq
Syrian expatriate sportspeople in Iraq
Expatriate footballers in Jordan
Syrian expatriate sportspeople in Jordan
Al-Shorta Damascus players
Al-Shorta SC players
Al-Baqa'a Club players
Syrian Premier League players